Wijdefjord is the longest fjord in Norway's Svalbard archipelago. Wijdefjord is located in the northern portion of the island of Spitsbergen, which lies in the Arctic Ocean about midway between Norway and the North Pole, and is the largest island in the archipelago. Opening on Spitsbergen's north coast, it runs roughly southwards into the interior, separating Andrée Land in the west from Margaretas Land in the east. The southern half of the fjord is part of Indre Wijdefjorden National Park.

External links
 A detailed map of Svalbard with Wijdefjord clearly labeled 

Fjords of Spitsbergen